Zachary Steven Terrell (born May 1, 1993) is an American football quarterback. He played college football for the Western Michigan Broncos where he won the William V. Campbell Trophy his senior year. He signed with the Baltimore Ravens as an undrafted free agent after the 2017 NFL Draft.

Early years
Terrell attended Homestead High School in Fort Wayne, Indiana. During his career, he passed for 6,940 yards and 89 touchdowns. He committed to Western Michigan University to play college football.

College career
After redshirting his first year at Western Michigan in 2012, Terrell completed 133 of 251 passes for 1,602 yards with eight touchdowns and eight interceptions as a redshirt freshman in 2013.
 
As a 13-game starter in 2014, he completed 250 of 368 passes for 3,443 yards, 26 touchdowns, and 10 interceptions.

He again started all 13 games his junior year in 2015, completing 262 of 391 for 3,522 yards, 29 touchdowns, and 9 interceptions, leading the Broncos to an 8–5 record and the program's first-ever bowl victory over Middle Tennessee in the Popeyes Bahamas Bowl. Terrell completed his BBA in finance cum laude in December 2015.

Also beginning coursework for an MBA, Terrell returned as a starter his senior year in 2016, where he threw 34 touchdowns to 4 interceptions, the best TD/INT ratio in the FBS. During the season, he broke Tim Hiller's school record for career passing yards. In 2016, Terrell led his Broncos to an undefeated 13–0 regular season, a Mid-American Conference championship, and a berth to the 2017 Cotton Bowl, where they lost to Wisconsin 24–16 in Terrell's final college game.

Professional career
Terrell signed with the Baltimore Ravens as an undrafted free agent on May 5, 2017. He was waived by the Ravens on May 8, 2017.

Post-football career
Terrell now works in business development for Zeigler Auto Group in Kalamazoo, MI.

References

External links

 
Western Michigan Broncos bio

1993 births
Living people
Players of American football from Fort Wayne, Indiana
American football quarterbacks
Western Michigan Broncos football players
Baltimore Ravens players